The National Highway System in Canada is a federal designation for a strategic transport network of highways and freeways.

The Government of Canada maintains very little power or authority over the maintenance or expansion of the system beyond sharing part of the cost of economically significant projects within the network. Highways within the system are not given any special signage, except where they are part of a Trans-Canada Highway route.

History
The system was first designated in 1988 by the Federal/Provincial/Territorial Council of Ministers Responsible for Transportation and Highway Safety, a council consisting of the federal, provincial and territorial Ministers of Transport. Highways selected for the system were existing primary routes that supported interprovincial and international trade and travel, by connecting major population or commercial centres with each other, with major border crossings on the Canada–United States border, or with other transport hubs.

It was in this era that the current "core", "feeder" and "northern or remote" classes of route were established. Not all highways within the system are designated in their entirety, but may instead be part of the system over only part of their length; a few highways even have two or more discontinuous segments designated as part of the system. In some locations, the National Highway System may also incorporate city arterial streets to connect highway routes which are part of the system but do not directly interconnect, or to link the system to an important intermodal transport hub—such as a shipping port, a railway terminal, an airport or a ferry terminal—which is not directly located on a provincial-class highway.

Routes within the system continue to be maintained, funded and signed as provincial, rather than federal, highways. However, the federal government provides some funding assistance for important maintenance and expansion projects on designated highways through cost sharing programs. For instance, several recent maintenance projects on National Highway System routes in Saskatchewan were partly funded under the federal government's Building Canada Fund–Major Infrastructure Component, while several four-laning projects in Ontario in the 2000s accessed federal funding under the Strategic Highway Infrastructure Program.

There is no single, ongoing program for federal contributions to the National Highway System; rather, these contributions have been made through a variety of separate infrastructure investment programs of defined length and scope. Recent transportation planning proposals have identified public-private partnerships and dedicated fuel taxes as possible mechanisms for providing more stable funding, although no comprehensive program has been implemented to date.

The National Highway System has been criticized for lacking a truly comprehensive expansion plan. In many parts of the country, the system relies on two-lane highways, or expressways which are not fully up to international freeway standards; according to Lakehead University economics professor Livio di Matteo, many parts of the system, even on the main Trans-Canada Highway portion of the network, still leave "the nation's east-west flow of personal and commercial traffic subject to the whims of an errant moose". Some motorists, further, prefer to drive between Western Canada and Eastern Canada by travelling through the United States rather than on Canadian highways; even though this represents a slightly longer trip than the Trans-Canada Highway route, it frequently takes a shorter amount of time due to the US Interstate system's higher speed limits, increased lane capacity, higher number of alternative routes, and reduced likelihood of being delayed by a road accident.

American transportation planning academic Wendell Cox has also identified improvements to the system, so that Canada would have a comprehensive national freeway network comparable to the American Interstate Highway System, as an economically critical project for the country to undertake in the 21st century.

Routes
In its current form, the National Highway System includes routes in all Canadian provinces and territories except Nunavut, which has no conventional road connections to any other Canadian province or territory.

Officially the system maintains three classifications of road: Core, Feeder and Northern/Remote. Within the core and feeder classes, the system's official register made additional distinctions between conventional core or feeder routes and intermodal links or "anomalies", where a highway that does not meet the normal criteria for inclusion, or a municipal arterial road, has been adopted into the system to fill in a gap in the network.  The "intermodal" and "anomaly" classes are not distinct designations, however, but simply represent an additional clarification of why the road holds "core" or "feeder" status.  Since 2016, the "anomaly" category has been dropped and the road is simply included in the specific list. The tables below do not include "intermodal" municipal streets which connect major highways to intermodal facilities.

Note that some highways listed here may be designated as part of the National Highway System over only a portion of their total length, rather than over the whole highway. Termini listed below are those of a highway's NHS designation only, and may not necessarily always correspond to the termini of the highway as a whole.

Alberta
The system includes  of highway in Alberta.

British Columbia
The system includes  of highway in British Columbia.

Manitoba
The system includes  of highway in Manitoba.

New Brunswick
The system includes  of highway in New Brunswick.

Newfoundland and Labrador
The system includes  of highway in Newfoundland and Labrador.

Northwest Territories
The system includes  of highway in the Northwest Territories.

Nova Scotia
The system includes  of highway in Nova Scotia.

Ontario
The system includes  of highway in Ontario.

Prince Edward Island
The system includes  of highway in Prince Edward Island.

Quebec
The system includes  of highway in Quebec.

Saskatchewan
The system includes  of highway in Saskatchewan.

Yukon
The system includes  of highway in Yukon.

References

Roads in Canada